Iwasawa may refer to:
, Japanese mathematician
Iwasawa decomposition, a mathematical group decomposition
Iwasawa group, a mathematical group whose subgroup lattice is modular
Iwasawa manifold, a mathematical six-dimensional space
Iwasawa Station, railway station
, a character from the anime, Angel Beats!